The "Lied der Partei" ('Song of the Party'), also known as  ('The Party is always right'), was the party song of the Socialist Unity Party of Germany (SED) the ruling party of East Germany. It was written by composer Louis Fürnberg. It is best known by the first line of its chorus:  ('The Party, the Party, is always right').

Use beyond the SED
A variation on the anthem has been used by the satirical party die PARTEI.

See also
 East German Cold War Propaganda

References

German anthems
Political party songs
Political songs
Propaganda songs
East German culture
Socialist Unity Party of Germany